Farouk Miya (born 26 November 1997) is a Ugandan professional footballer who plays as an attacking midfielder for TFF First League club Çaykur Rizespor and the Uganda national team.

Club career
In January 2016, it was announced that Miya would be joining Belgian top flight club, Standard Liège in what was reported to be an initial loan deal taking him from Ugandan club Vipers. Standard Liège acquired his services for a fee of 400,000 US$.

On 31 January 2017, Miya was loaned to Royal Excel Mouscron until the end of the season.

In February 2018, Miya was loaned to Səbail FK, returning at the end of the 2017–18 season.

On 20 August 2019, Miya signed a three-year contract with Süper Lig side Konyaspor. He made his debut five days later against Galatasaray at Türk Telekom Stadium.

He joined TFF First League club Çaykur Rizespor on a two-year contract in July 2022.

International career
Miya made his debut for the Uganda national team on 11 July 2014 against Seychelles.

Career statistics

International

Scores and results list Uganda's goal tally first, score column indicates score after each Miya goal. This list includes non official goals.

Honours
Standard Liège
Belgian Cup: 2015–16

References

External links
 

Living people
1995 births
People from Butambala District
Association football midfielders
Ugandan footballers
Uganda international footballers
2017 Africa Cup of Nations players
2019 Africa Cup of Nations players
Vipers SC players
Standard Liège players
Royal Excel Mouscron players
Sabail FK players
HNK Gorica players
Konyaspor footballers
FC Lviv players
Çaykur Rizespor footballers
Belgian Pro League players
Azerbaijan Premier League players
Croatian Football League players
Süper Lig players
Ugandan expatriate footballers
Ugandan expatriate sportspeople in Belgium
Expatriate footballers in Belgium
Expatriate footballers in Azerbaijan
Ugandan expatriate sportspeople in Croatia
Expatriate footballers in Croatia
Ugandan expatriate sportspeople in Turkey
Expatriate footballers in Turkey
Ugandan expatriate sportspeople in Ukraine
Expatriate footballers in Ukraine
Uganda A' international footballers
2016 African Nations Championship players